The 1934 Washington and Lee Generals football team represented Washington and Lee University as a member of the Southern Conference (SoCon) during the 1934 college football season. Led by second-year head coach Warren E. Tilson, the General compiled an overall record of 7–3 with a record of 4–0, winning the SoCon title.

Schedule

References

Washington and Lee
Washington and Lee Generals football seasons
Southern Conference football champion seasons
Washington And Lee Generals football